The Windsor Police Service is the municipal law enforcement agency in Windsor, Ontario, Canada. It succeeded the Royal Canadian Rifle Regiment.

Since 2019, the Windsor Police Service has also provided contract policing services for the nearby Town of Amherstburg. In 2021, it submitted a proposal to provide policing services for the Municipality of Leamington. The municipality rejected the proposal and continues to be served by the Ontario Provincial Police.

The current chief of police is Jason Bellaire, who previously served as a deputy chief and acting chief before being appointed to the role in November 2022.

Organization
The Windsor Police Service headquarters is located at 150 Goyeau Street in downtown Windsor. The building incorporates an Ontario Court of Justice courthouse.

In addition, the service maintains secondary sites:

 Major FA Tilston Armoury & Police Training Centre, 4007 Sandwich St. (shared with the Department of National Defence)
 Sandwich Community Services, 3312 Sandwich St.
 Collision Reporting Centre, 2696 Jefferson Blvd.
The police service employs 473 sworn members and 153 civilian members. The organization is divided into two areas: Operations and Operational Support.

Operations

Emergency 911 Centre
The Windsor Police Emergency 911 Centre handles all incoming 911 calls in the City of Windsor. It dispatches police officers, while calls for fire and EMS are routed to their respective agencies. The Emergency 911 Centre co-operates with the Canadian Coast Guard, Canada Border Services Agency and U.S. Customs and Border Protection.

Investigations
 General Investigations Unit
 Major Crimes Unit
 Special Victims Unit
 Target Based Unit

Investigative Support
 Investigative Analysis
 Drugs & Gun Enforcement
 Intelligence
 Property & Evidence Retention

Patrol and Patrol Response
 Downtown directed patrol
 Crisis Outreach and Support Team (COAST)

Patrol Support
 Court Operations
 Emergency Services Unit
 Explosive Disposal Unit
 Marine Unit
 Police Dog Unit
 Traffic Branch
 Collision Reporting Centre

Operational Support
 Information Services
 Planning & Physical Services
 Professional Advancement
 Professional Standards Branch
 Quality Assurance and Audits
 Technology Services

Windsor Police Pipe Band
The Windsor Police Pipe Band was founded in 1967. The band performs at a variety of community events, including parades, police memorial services and funerals. Two groups also compete under the Windsor Police's name in grade 3 and 5. Membership is open to any individual.

Police chiefs
The following is a list of Windsor's police chiefs:
 Samuel Port 1867
 William Bains
 Daniel Thompson
 Mortimore Wigle
 James P. Smith
 Claude Renaud 1935 to 1950
 Edwin V. McNeill - O.P.P. Staff Inspector. Temporary appointment. 1950/51
 Carl W. Farrow 1951 to 1968
 Gordon Preston 1968 to 1974
 John Williamson 1974 to 1980
 Jack Shuttleworth 1980 to 1984
 John Hughes 1984 to 1988
 Jim Adkin 1988-1994
 John Kousik 1994-1999
 Glenn Stannard 1999-2008
 Gary Smith 2008-2012
 Al Frederick 2012-2019
 Pamela Mizuno 2019-2022
 Jason Bellaire 2022 - Present

Scholarship
A memorial scholarship named John Atkinson Scholarship Award for Police Foundations is yearly given by St. Clair College for students who aspire to become police officers. The scholarship was named for PC John Atkinson, who was shot and murdered on duty in 2005.

References

External links

1867 establishments in Ontario
Law enforcement agencies of Ontario
Municipal law enforcement agencies
Municipal government of Windsor, Ontario